Events from the year 1773 in France

Incumbents
 Monarch – Louis XV

Events

Births

2 September – Louis-Auguste-Victor, Count de Ghaisnes de Bourmont, Marshal of France (died 1846)

Full date missing
Nicolas Viton de Saint-Allais, genealogist (died 1842)
Charles Lefebvre-Desnouettes, military officer (died 1822)
François Fournier-Sarlovèze, military officer (died 1827)

Deaths

Full date missing
Philibert Commerson, naturalist (born 1727)
Philippe Buache, geographer (born 1700)
Maximin de Bompart, naval officer (born 1698)
Philippe de La Guêpière, architect (born c.1715)

See also

References

1770s in France